Earl of Dumfries is a title in the Peerage of Scotland.  It was originally created for William Crichton, 9th Lord Crichton of Sanquhar, in 1633, and stayed in the Crichton family until the death of the fourth countess in 1742, at which point the title passed to first the Dalrymple and then the McDouall families before finally being inherited by the Marquesses of Bute, where it remains today.

The subsidiary titles of the Earl of Dumfries are: Viscount of Ayr and Lord Sanquhar (created 2 February 1622), Lord Crichton of Sanquhar (1488), and Lord Crichton of Cumnock (12 June 1633), all in the Peerage of Scotland.

Family history

The traditional account of the origins of the Dumfries family are that the descended a noble Hungarian, that came to Scotland with Queen Margaret, in the during the reign of Malcolm III of Scotland.

The family origins are in Crichton, Midlothian. Thurstanus de Crichton was present at the charter of Holyrood Abbey alongside King David I in 1128.

Sanquhar Castle was built by Lord Crichton in the 13th century in the south west Scotland in the area of Dumfries and Galloway. The lord's descended to become the Earls of Dumfries, a title in the peerage of Scotland in 1633 for William Crichton, 1st Earl of Dumfries seventh Lord Crichton of Sanquhar, he was invested the viscount of Ayr, Feb 2 1622, the earl of Dumfries, and Lord Crichton of Sanquhar and Cumnock, June 12th 1633. William was made the Earl of Menteith, December 20th that year too.
The Castle was sold Crichtons during the mid 1600s to the Duke of Queensberry. The castle a ruin, was bought in 1895 by John Crichton-Stuart, 3rd Marquess of Bute, by a descendant of the Lord Crichton.

William, was the fifth earl of Dumfries, in 1721 he was commissioned in his uncle's 'Earl of Stair's regiment', and the 6th dragoons, he would continue to fight in the army until 1747. In 1742 he became the Earl following his Mother the Countess' death. During his military career he fought at the Battle of Dettingen as aide-de-camp to the Earl of Stair. Afterwards in 1744 he was appointed captain-lieutenant in the third regiment of footguards, during this period he was Sheriff of Clackmannan for the year 1742–47. In 1752 he was invested with the Order of the Thistle, and in 1760 he succeeded his brother James, as fourth earl of Stair, and was thenceforward styled earl of Dumfries and Stair. The Earl left a legacy in commissioning the Adams brothers, Robert, John and James, to design a new house to be called Leifnorris House. It was later that the name was to be changed to Dumfries House in line with his title. The house was completed on time and on budget in 1759. On July 27, 1768, he died at Dumfries House without an heir, his widow left to move to Edinburgh. He was succeeded in the title Earl of Dumfries by his nephew, Patrick Macdowall of Freugh; and the Earl of Stair went to his cousin, John Dalrymple. 

 
The Dumfries family seat was inherited by his nephew, Patrick McDouall-Crichton, 6th Earl of Dumfries (1726-1803). His daughter Lady Elisabeth Penelope married the John Stuart, Lord Mount Stuart, and was the grandmother of the 2nd Marquess of Bute, 7th Earl of Dumfires who merged the two titles of Dumfries and Bute. The subsequent 2nd, 3rd and 4th Marquess of Bute/7th, 8th and 9th Earls of Dumfries became involved in the coal mining industry in south Wales creating 2 gothic revival residences, Cardiff Castle and Castell Coch.
The 10th Earl of Dumfries became involved with birds working as an ornithologist; he purchased the islands of St Kilda, leaving it to the National Trust for Scotland in 1956. The eleventh Earl of Dumfries became a scholar being having graduated from Trinity College, Cambridge, also becoming a fellow at the University of Edinburgh. A patron of the arts he held successive positions for decades, such as trustees and chairman on councils and boards in the United kingdom. He sold family's properties in Edinburgh and Cardiff to pay his father's death tax. The earl also took traditional roles as the Lord Lieutenant of Bute and of Argyll.  The Earl's business had employed the most people on the Isle of Bute, a designer fabrics and contemporary furniture company. 

One of the most important transitions fell to the 12th Earl. He was known as 'Johnny Dumfries' a Formula 1 race car driver featuring in the  season. The occupation of Dumfries House had been a family home from 1760 to 1993, when the last full-time occupant Lady Eileen, Dowager Marchioness of Bute, passed away. The house remained in the hands of the 7th Marquess of Bute who ensured that it was maintained, although not used as a primary residence, since then Charles, Prince of Wales bought Dumfries house to maintain its history by opening it to the public.

Lords Crichton of Sanquhar (1488)
Robert Crichton, 1st Lord Crichton of Sanquhar (d. 1494)
Robert Crichton, 2nd Lord Crichton of Sanquhar (d. 1513)
Robert Crichton, 3rd Lord Crichton of Sanquhar (?)
Robert Crichton, 4th Lord Crichton of Sanquhar (d. 1536)
William Crichton, 5th Lord Crichton of Sanquhar (d. 1550)
Robert Crichton, 6th Lord Crichton of Sanquhar (d. 1561)
Edward Crichton, 7th Lord Crichton of Sanquhar (d. 1569)
Robert Crichton, 8th Lord Crichton of Sanquhar (d. 1612)
William Crichton, 9th Lord Crichton of Sanquhar (1578–1643) (became Viscount of Ayr and Lord Sanquhar in 1622)

Viscounts of Ayr (1622) 
William Crichton, 1st Viscount of Ayr (1578–1643)(became Earl of Dumfries and Lord Critchton of Cumnock in 1633)

Earls of Dumfries (1633) 
 William Crichton, 1st Earl of Dumfries (1578–1643)
 William Crichton, 2nd Earl of Dumfries (1598–1691); eldest son of the 1st Earl
 William Crichton, 3rd Earl of Dumfries (d. 1694); grandson of the 2nd Earl, died without issue

 Penelope Crichton, 4th Countess of Dumfries (d. 1742); sister of the 3rd Earl
 William Dalrymple-Crichton, 5th Earl of Dumfries, 4th Earl of Stair (1699–1769); eldest son of the 4th Countess, with no male heir, the Earldom of Stair passed to a cousin who was a grandson of the 1st Earl of Stair
Lady Elizabeth Dalrymple
 Patrick McDouall-Crichton, 6th Earl of Dumfries (1726–1803)
Lady Elizabeth Penelope McDouall-Crichton (1772-1797); only daughter and heir of the 6th Earl of Dumfries
John Crichton-Stuart, 2nd Marquess of Bute and 7th Earl of Dumfries (1793–1848); only son of Lady Elizabeth McDouall-Crichton and grandson of the 6th Earl
John Patrick Crichton-Stuart, 3rd Marquess of Bute and 8th Earl of Dumfries (1847–1900); only son of the 2nd Marquess and 8th Earl.
John Crichton-Stuart, 4th Marquess of Bute and 9th Earl of Dumfries (1881–1947); eldest son of the 3rd Marquess and 9th Earl.
John Crichton-Stuart, 5th Marquess of Bute and 10th Earl of Dumfries (1907–1956); eldest son of the 4th Marquess and 9th Earl.
John Crichton-Stuart, 6th Marquess of Bute and 11th Earl of Dumfries (1933–1993); eldest son of the 5th Marquess and 10th Earl.
John Colum Crichton-Stuart, 7th Marquess of Bute and 12th Earl of Dumfries (1958-2021); eldest son of the 6th Marquess and 11th Earl.
John Bryson Crichton-Stuart, 8th Marquess of Bute and 13th Earl of Dumfries (b. 1989); eldest son of the 7th Marquess and 12th Earl. 

The heir presumptive to the Marquessate of Bute is  Lord Anthony Crichton-Stuart (b.1961), second son of the 6th Marquess and uncle of the 8th Marquess.

The heir presumptive to the Earldom of Dumfries is  Lady Caroline Crichton-Stuart (b. 1984), eldest daughter of the 12th Earl (7th Marquess) and elder sister of the current Earl (8th Marquess).

Family Tree

See also
Marquess of Bute
Earl of Stair

Notes

References

Earldoms in the Peerage of Scotland
Noble titles created in 1633

Peerages created with special remainders